The 1956 Iowa gubernatorial election was held on November 6, 1956. Democratic nominee Herschel C. Loveless defeated incumbent Republican Leo Hoegh with 51.22% of the vote.

Primary elections
Primary elections were held on June 4, 1956.

Democratic primary

Candidates
Herschel C. Loveless, former Mayor of Ottumwa
Lawrence E. Plummer

Results

Republican primary

Candidates
Leo Hoegh, incumbent Governor

Results

General election

Candidates
Herschel C. Loveless, Democratic 
Leo Hoegh, Republican

Results

References

1956
Iowa
Gubernatorial